Great Sauk Trail can refer to:

Sauk Trail, an Indian trail across Illinois, Indiana and Michigan
Great Sauk Trail Council, a Boy Scout council in southern Michigan